Samuel Willard (1640–1707) was an American colonial clergyman.

Samuel Willard may also refer to:

 Samuel Willard (physician) (1748–1801), American physician
 Samuel George Willard (1819–1887), American clergyman and politician